Mahalleh-ye Zoshk-e Olya (also Romanized as Maḩalleh-ye Zoshk-e ‘Olyā; also known as Maḩalleh-ye Zoshk-e Bālā, Maḩalleh-ye Zoshk, and Mahalleh-ye Zoshke-e Bālā) is a village in Shandiz Rural District, Shandiz District, Torqabeh and Shandiz County, Razavi Khorasan Province, Iran. At the 2006 census, its population was 47, in 12 families.

References 

Populated places in Torqabeh and Shandiz County